Readymades may refer to:

 Found objects
 Readymades (album), an album by Chumbawamba

See also 
 Readymades of Marcel Duchamp